Wei Yen is a Taiwanese-American technologist and serial entrepreneur. He has been involved with several companies, including most recently as Chairman and Founder of AiLive.

Yen received his Ph.D. in Electrical Engineering in Operating Systems and Artificial Intelligence from Purdue University. Yen and his brother David Yen along with King-sun Fu published the paper "Data Coherence Problem in a Multicache System" that describes a practical cache coherence protocol.

Career
Yen served as the Director of Software Engineering for Cydrome Inc, where he worked with his brother David, who served as the Director of Hardware Engineering. They were the major contributors to the Cydra-5 mini-supercomputer. The system was a combination of a VLIW ECL-based processor used for scientific applications and a multi-processor system designed for a bus architecture based on their Cache Coherence protocol.

Yen served as Senior Vice President of SGI from 1988 to 1996, where he led development on OpenGL and also served as President of subsidiary MIPS Technologies. In 1996, he left SGI and founded TVsoft, a maker of interactive software for television setup devices. The company was renamed Navio and later merged with Oracle's Network Computer (NC). Subsequently, the company went public as Liberate Technologies in July 1999. Its public offering reached a $12 billion valuation in early 2000 with a revenue run rate of $25 million.

In parallel, Yen founded a company called ArtX, employed with former SGI graphics engineers. ArtX received the contract to deliver the Nintendo GameCube's Flipper graphics chip. The company was acquired by ATI in February 2000 for $400 million. This led to ATI's greatly improved R300 graphics chip family. Yen later joined ATI's board of directors.

With Nintendo, Yen cofounded another company iQue, the manufacturing and distributing arm of Nintendo for mainland China.

Yen founded iGware, a company that offers cloud computing services to its customers, including Nintendo. iGware's cloud services power the online services of the Nintendo DS, Wii, Nintendo 3DS, and Wii U. In July 2011, Acer, of which Yen is a former board member, acquired the US-based iGware for $320 million, and thus iGware becomes a part of Acer's company structure in providing cloud services. iGware changed its name to Acer Cloud Technology Co. and continued to be headed by Yen. As a result of the acquisition, Yen is the second largest shareholder of Acer after founder Stan Shih.

Yen is currently the chairman and founder of AiLive, the company that partnered with Nintendo in developing software tools for programmers working with the Wii Remote controller and Wii MotionPlus attachment.

Yen has been on the board of several prominent companies including Acer, ATI, MoSys, and others.

See also
IQue Player

References

People in information technology
Living people
Nintendo people
Silicon Graphics people
Computer programmers
IQue
Purdue University College of Engineering alumni
1952 births